This is a list of villages in Nordland, a county of Norway. For other counties see the lists of villages in Norway.   Villages that have co-official names in one of the Sami languages are listed with both names.  The list excludes cities located in Nordland.

References

External links

 

Nordland